The Qatar Masters was a European Tour golf tournament held at Doha Golf Club in Doha, Qatar. When founded in 1998, it was one of two European Tour events to be staged in the Arabian Peninsula, but was at one point, one of six. From 2005 to 2007 the tournament was co-sanctioned by the Asian Tour.

The tournament had modest fields in its early years, but with the aid of "promotional" money paid to top golfers to appear, and being scheduled within a three-week period that included events in Dubai and Abu Dhabi, it developed to have one of the European Tour's strongest fields. 

In 2018, due to travel restrictions between the United Arab Emirates and Qatar as a result of the ongoing diplomatic dispute in the Arab World, it was moved to later in the year, and is no longer held at the same time as the Abu Dhabi and Dubai events. The date change coincided with a reduction in prize money, and resulted in a lower field strength than previous editions.

The 2022 event became the final edition of the tournament due to the Asian Tour acquiring Doha Golf Club as a venue for the 2023 International Series Qatar.

Winners

Notes

References

External links

Coverage on the European Tour's official site
Doha Golf Club

Former European Tour events
Former Asian Tour events
Golf tournaments in Qatar
Recurring sporting events established in 1998
1998 establishments in Qatar